Weightlifting competitions at the 2008 Summer Olympics in Beijing, China were held from August 9 to August 19. Competitions were conducted at the Beihang University Gymnasium.

The medal records at the 2008 Games were heavily amended following re-analysis of competitors samples in 2015, 2016 and 2017. 26 lifters were disqualified as a result of these tests, including 16 medalists and four lifters who stood to inherit forfeited medals.

Events

15 sets of medals were awarded in the following events:

Qualification

Medalists

Men

Women

  Tigran Gevorg Martirosyan of Armenia originally won the bronze medal, but he was disqualified after a positive anti-doping test of his 2008 sample.
  Andrei Rybakou of Belarus originally won the silver medal, but he was disqualified after a positive anti-doping test of his 2008 sample.
  Ilya Ilyin of Kazakhstan and Khadzhimurat Akkaev of Russia originally won the gold and medal bronze medal respectively, but they were disqualified after positive anti-doping tests of their 2008 samples.
   Dmitry Lapikov of Russia originally won the bronze medal, but he was disqualified after a positive anti-doping test of his 2008 sample.
  Chen Xiexia of China and Sibel Özkan of Turkey originally won the gold and silver medal respectively, but they were disqualified after a positive anti-doping test of their 2008 samples. 
  Nastassia Novikava of Belarus originally won the bronze medal, but she was disqualified after a positive anti-doping test of her 2008 sample.
  Marina Shainova of Russia originally won the silver medal, but she was disqualified after a positive anti-doping test of her 2008 sample.
  Irina Nekrassova of Kazakhstan originally won the silver medal, but she was disqualified after a positive anti-doping test of her 2008 sample.
   Liu Chunhong of China and Nataliya Davydova of Ukraine originally won the gold and bronze medal respectively, but they were disqualified after positive anti-doping tests of their 2008 samples.
   Cao Lei of China and Nadezhda Evstyukhina of Russia originally won the gold and bronze medal respectively, but they were disqualified after positive anti-doping test of their 2008 samples.
   Olha Korobka of Ukraine and Mariya Grabovetskaya of Kazakhstan originally won the silver and bronze medal respectively, but they were disqualified after positive anti-doping test of their 2008 samples.

Medal table

Participating nations
A total of 255 weightlifters from 84 nations competed at the Beijing Games:

References

External links
International Weightlifting Federation 
Official Result Book – Weightlifting

 
2008 Summer Olympics events
Olympics
2008
International weightlifting competitions hosted by China